The General Confederation of Greek Workers (GSEE), in Greek Γ.Σ.Ε.Ε, is the highest, tertiary trade union body in Greece. It was founded in 1918 and is affiliated with the International Trade Union Confederation.

GSEE is made up of 83 worker unions and 74 departmental secondary confederations. Its primary purpose is defending the interests of all private sector workers in Greece. To that purpose, it negotiates with the employer unions the signing of national union labour agreements and also has the ability to call all workers of the private sector on strike in case the need arises.

GSEE has established a number of supporting institutes. INE/GSEE-ADEDY is tasked with the provision of GSEE and ADEDY, the equivalent of GSEE in the public sector, of formulated scientific data reports which GSEE and ADEDY use for the scientific validations of their argumentation when dealing with the employers. KE.PE.A is tasked with the provision of information and legal advice to all workers and unemployed people in Greece. A.RIS.TOS is tasked with the tracking and filling of the historical evidence of all worker unions in Greece. KANEP/GSEE is tasked with the support of policy of GSEE in education and the R&D field.

Today, GSEE faces the issues of unemployment, sustainable social insurance and sustainable economic growth. During the Greek public debt crisis of 2010, GSEE has worked to protect the established labour rights in the private sector which have been under pressure by the 2010 EU-IMF-ECB memorandum to Greece. 
To this day although GSEE, has been affiliated by the capitalist ideology and has lost its pro workers character, that GSEE had when it was created. Like the other union Civil Servants' Confederation, which is a union for civil servants and state employed workers, they have become boss' unions and no longer represent the workers movement in Greece. Within GSEE there are different syndicalist fronts that during the last decade have a more central role in the labor movement representing the actual needs and struggles of the workers like the All-Workers Militant Front, within which members and cadres of the Communist Party of Greece also participate.

See also

Trade unions in Greece

References

External links
 Official site

Trade unions in Greece
International Trade Union Confederation
National federations of trade unions
1918 establishments in Greece
Trade unions established in 1918